All the Night Hides (Greek: , lit. "As Long as the Night is Hidden", alternative Greek title Agria nychta (Άγρια νύχτα)) is a 1963 Greek theatrical comedy film directed by Stelios Zografakis.

The film stars Petros Fyssoun, Martha Vourtsi, Dionysis Papayiannopoulos, Andreas Douzos, Efi Oikonomou, Hristos Tsaganeas, Nitsa Tsaganea and Nikos Fermas.

Plot

A youth influenced in the violation for easy enrichment.

Cast
Petros Fyssoun ..... Sotiris Kapayas
Andreas Douzos ..... Alekos
Martha Vourtsi ..... Soula
Dionysis Papagiannopoulos ..... Thomas
Christos Tsaganeas ..... Dimitris
Efi Economou ..... Nadia
Nikos Fermas ..... car salesman
Nitsa Tsaganea ..... Alexandra
Kostas Papachristos ..... police captain

Information

Genre: Drama
Colour: Black and white
Tickets: 118,113
Participated at the 1963 Thessaloniki Film Festival

External links
 Osa kryvei i nychta at cine.gr

1963 drama films
Greek comedy films
1960s Greek-language films
1963 films